Myron Holley (April 29, 1779 Salisbury, Litchfield County, Connecticut – March 4, 1841 Rochester, Monroe County, New York) was an American politician who had a large part in the construction of the Erie Canal.

Life
Holley was the son of Luther Holley (1752–1824) and Sarah Dakin Holley (1755–1830). He graduated in 1799 from Williams College.

He was a member from Ontario County of the New York State Assembly in 1816 and 1820-21. He worked with DeWitt Clinton to convince the State Legislature to finance the construction of the Erie Canal. He was among the Erie Canal Commissioners appointed in 1816 to supervise the construction and was chosen Treasurer of the Canal Commission. He oversaw the construction of the canal in-person living with the workers for eight years.

In 1822, he built the Old Stone Warehouse at Rochester on speculation.  In 1824, an audit revealed a shortage of about $30,000 in the canal funds, and Holley resigned on March 30, giving his personal property to make good for part of the shortage. Holley died a pauper in Rochester, New York and was buried in Mount Hope Cemetery. His monument there was paid for by members of the Liberty Party which he likely conceived and had co-founded with John Greenleaf Whittier and others.

Holley was a descendant of astronomer Edmund Halley.  Orville L. Holley, Horace Holley, and John Milton Holley were his brothers.

The village of Holley, New York is named after him.

Notes

Sources
 The Rebel of Rose Ridge - Myron Holley's Days in Rochester by Donovan A. Shilling
  (gives birthdate April 20, but on the stone is written April 29)
The New York Civil List compiled by Franklin Benjamin Hough (pages 40 and 281; Weed, Parsons and Co., 1858)
Laws of the State of New York, in Relation to the Erie and Champlain Canals: Together with the Annual Reports of the Canal Commission Ers, and Other Documents Requisite for a Complete Official History of Those Works etc. published by the Secretary of State's Office, New York (State) (E. and E. Hosford, printers, 1825) with the Attorney General's Report on the question if Holley's sureties had liability to refund the State for the remainder of the shortage, with an outline of Holley's chaotic financial proceedings

1779 births
1841 deaths
Burials at Mount Hope Cemetery (Rochester)
People from Salisbury, Connecticut
People from Ontario County, New York
Politicians from Rochester, New York
Members of the New York State Assembly
Williams College alumni
Erie Canal Commissioners
New York (state) Libertyites
Activists from Rochester, New York